Sir Alan Stewart Watt  (13 April 1901 – 18 September 1988) was a distinguished Australian diplomat.

Background and career
Born of Scottish heritage, Watt attended Sydney Boys High School. A graduate of the Universities of Sydney and Oxford, he was a New South Wales Rhodes Scholar for 1921. In 1924, he played singles and doubles tennis at Wimbledon as the captain of Oxford.

Watt first joined the Commonwealth Public Service in the Department of External Affairs, in 1937. He served in the United States during World War II and was one of the Australian delegates at the United Nations Conference on International Organization. In 1947 Watt became the Australian minister to the Soviet Union and in 1948 the first Australian Ambassador in Moscow. In 1950 he returned to Australia and was appointed Secretary to the Department and was instrumental in negotiation of the ANZUS and SEATO treaties. He then served as High Commissioner to both Singapore and Southeast Asia (1954–1956), Ambassador to Japan (1956–1960) and Ambassador to Germany (1960–1962). Leaving the Department of Foreign Affairs in 1962, he became a Visiting Fellow of the Australian National University, and Director of the Australian Institute of International Affairs (1963–1969).

He wrote a number of books and articles in retirement, including The Evolution of Australian Foreign Policy 1938–1965 (1967, Cambridge University Press, 67-10782), Vietnam - An Australian Analysis (1968, Melbourne, F. W. Cheshire for Australian Institute of International Relations), and Australian Diplomat - Memoirs of Sir Alan Watt (1972, Angus and Robertson).

Awards and honours
Alan Watt was honoured as a Commander of the Order of the British Empire in June 1952, and as a Knight Bachelor in June 1954.

In 2011, a street in the Canberra suburb of Casey was named Alan Watt Crescent in Watt's honour.

Works
 The changing margins of Australian foreign policy, 1964, Australian Institute of International Affairs
 Australian defence policy 1951-63: major international aspects, 1964, Dept. of International Relations, Research School of Pacific Studies, Institute of Advanced Studies, Australian National University
 Vietnam, an Australian analysis, 1968, Cheshire for the Australian Institute of International Affairs
 Australian Diplomat - Memoirs of Sir Alan Watt, 1972, Verlag Angus and Robertson.

References

1901 births
1988 deaths
Ambassadors of Australia to the Soviet Union
Ambassadors of Australia to Japan
Ambassadors of Australia to West Germany
Australian Commanders of the Order of the British Empire
High Commissioners of Australia to Singapore
Australian Knights Bachelor
Australian Rhodes Scholars
People educated at Sydney Boys High School
University of Sydney alumni
20th-century Australian public servants
Australian male tennis players